Viktar Mikalayevich Dashkevich (3 January 1945 – 31 March 2020) was a Belarusian stage actor.

Biography
Viktar Dashkevich was born in the Chashniki District, Vitebsk region, Belarus, on January 3, 1945. In 1973, he graduated from the Belarusian State Academy of Arts. From 1973 to 1990, and after 1991, Dashkevich worked at the Yakub Kolas National Academic Drama Theater. From 1990 to 1991, he was Director of the Belarusian Theater "Lyalka" in Vitebsk. From 1981 to 1990, as well as from 1991 to 2007, Dashkevich served as the head of the troupe of the Yakub Kolas Theater. Dashkevich died in March 2020 in Vitebsk after contracting COVID-19 (he had suffered from chronic lung disease for many years).

He is buried in the Orthodox Hieorhijeŭskija Cemetery near Ruba.

Awards
 Francis Skaryna Medal (2010)
 Diploma of the Ministry of Culture of the Republic of Belarus (2016)
 Honored Artist of the Republic of Belarus (2016)

References

External links 
 Профиль на сайте театра
 

1945 births
2020 deaths
Belarusian male stage actors
Deaths from the COVID-19 pandemic in Belarus
20th-century Belarusian male actors
Soviet male actors
People from Chashniki District
Belarusian State Academy of Arts alumni